Charles Augustus "Whitey" Alperman (November 11, 1879 – December 25, 1942) was a Major League Baseball second baseman who played for the Brooklyn Superbas from  to . In , he tied for the league lead in triples. He was also in the top three in hit by pitch in 1906 and 1907. In 1909, he batted 442 times, while only receiving two walks, which is the lowest single-season walk ratio recorded in the twentieth century, of players with 300 or more plate appearances.

Alperman died at the age of 63 in Pittsburgh, Pennsylvania, and was buried at the Mount Royal Cemetery in Glenshaw, Pennsylvania.

See also
List of Major League Baseball annual triples leaders

References

External links

1879 births
1942 deaths
Baseball players from Pennsylvania
Major League Baseball second basemen
Brooklyn Superbas players
Davenport River Rats players
Rochester Bronchos players
Atlanta Crackers managers
Atlanta Crackers players
Burials at Mount Royal Cemetery